Brent Miles is the president of the Tri-City Dust Devils, a short-season single-A affiliate of the San Diego Padres of the Northwest League, the president of the Rancho Cucamonga Quakes, and the president of the High Desert Mavericks of the California League.

References

External links
Tri-City Dust Devils official website
Rancho Cucamonga Quakes official website
High Desert Mavericks official website

Living people
Minor league baseball executives
Year of birth missing (living people)